The Recherche Archipelago, a large island group off the southern coast of Western Australia, is recognised as containing 22 terrestrial reptile species. This is a list of reptiles of the Recherche Archipelago:

References

Further reading
 

Recherche Archipelago
Reptiles of the Recherche Archipelago
Reptiles
Recherche Archipelago